Mars Hills are a small group of low rounded hills of a distinct red color, located  north of Mount Davidson in the Convoy Range of Victoria Land, Antarctica. The name was proposed in 1977 by New Zealand geologist Christopher J. Burgess in association with the Viking Hills and because of the color resemblance to that of the planet Mars.

References

Hills of Victoria Land
Scott Coast